{{Infobox scientist
| honorific_suffix  = FRS
| image             = E. O. Wilson sitting, October 16, 2007 (cropped).jpg
| image_size        = 
| caption           = Wilson in 2007
| birth_name        = Edward Osborne Wilson
| birth_date        = 
| birth_place       = Birmingham, Alabama, U.S.
| death_date        = 
| death_place       = Burlington, Massachusetts, U.S.
| residence         = 
| citizenship       = 
| ethnicity         = 
| fields            = 
 Entomology
 Myrmecology
| workplaces        = 
 Harvard University
 Museum of Natural History
| education         = 
| doctoral_advisor  = Frank M. Carpenter
| thesis_title      = A Monographic Revision of the Ant Genus Lasius
| thesis_url        = http://search.proquest.com/docview/301948222/
| thesis_year       = 1955
| academic_advisors = 
| doctoral_students = 
| known_for         = 
| author_abbrev_zoo = 
| influences        = 
| influenced        = 
| awards            = {{collapsible list|title={{nobold|}}|}}
| signature         = 
| footnotes         = 
| spouse            = 
}}Edward Osborne Wilson' FRS (June 10, 1929 – December 26, 2021) was an American biologist, naturalist, ecologist, and entomologist known for developing the field of sociobiology.

Born in Alabama, Wilson found an early interest with nature and frequented the outdoors. At age seven, he was partially blinded in a fishing accident; due to his reduced sight, Wilson resolved to study entomology. After matriculating at the University of Alabama, Wilson transferred to complete his dissertation at Harvard University, where he distinguished himself in multiple fields. In 1956, he co-authored a paper defining the theory of character displacement; in 1967, he developed the theory of island biogeography with Robert MacArthur in Sociobiology: The New Synthesis.

Wilson was the Pellegrino University Research Professor Emeritus in Entomology for the Department of Organismic and Evolutionary Biology at Harvard University, a lecturer at Duke University, and a fellow of the Committee for Skeptical Inquiry. The Royal Swedish Academy awarded Wilson the Crafoord Prize. He was a humanist laureate of the International Academy of Humanism. He was a two-time winner of the Pulitzer Prize for General Nonfiction (for On Human Nature in 1979, and The Ants in 1991) and a New York Times bestselling author for The Social Conquest of Earth, Letters to a Young Scientist, and The Meaning of Human Existence.

Wilson's work received both praise and criticism during his lifetime. The release of Sociobiology was received negatively from several of his own colleagues, and Wilson's theory of evolution resulted in a widely-reported dispute with Richard Dawkins. Examinations of his letters after his death revealed that he had supported the psychologist J. Philippe Rushton, whose work on race has been widely regarded by the scientific community as deeply flawed and racist.

Early life
Edward Osborne Wilson was born on June 10, 1929, in Birmingham, Alabama; he was the single child of Inez Linnette Freeman and Edward Osborne Wilson Sr. According to his autobiography, Naturalist, he grew up in various towns in the Southern United States which included Mobile, Decatur, and Pensacola. From an early age, he was interested in natural history. His father was an alcoholic who eventually committed suicide. His parents allowed him to bring home black widow spiders and keep them on the porch. 
They divorced when he was seven years old.

In the same year that his parents divorced, Wilson blinded himself in his right eye in a fishing accident. Despite the prolonged pain, he did not stop fishing. He did not complain because he was anxious to stay outdoors, and never sought medical treatment. Several months later, his right pupil clouded over with a cataract. He was admitted to Pensacola Hospital to have the lens removed. Wilson writes, in his autobiography, that the "surgery was a terrifying [19th] century ordeal". Wilson retained full sight in his left eye, with a vision of 20/10. The 20/10 vision prompted him to focus on "little things": "I noticed butterflies and ants more than other kids did, and took an interest in them automatically." Although he had lost his stereoscopic vision, he could still see fine print and the hairs on the bodies of small insects. His reduced ability to observe mammals and birds led him to concentrate on insects.

At the age of nine, Wilson undertook his first expeditions at the Rock Creek Park in Washington, D.C. He began to collect insects and he gained a passion for butterflies. He would capture them using nets made with brooms, coat hangers, and cheesecloth bags. Going on these expeditions led to Wilson's fascination with ants. He describes in his autobiography how one day he pulled the bark of a rotting tree away and discovered citronella ants underneath. The worker ants he found were "short, fat, brilliant yellow, and emitted a strong lemony odor". Wilson said the event left a "vivid and lasting impression on [him]". He also earned the Eagle Scout award and served as Nature Director of his Boy Scout summer camp. At age 18, intent on becoming an entomologist, he began by collecting flies, but the shortage of insect pins caused by World War II caused him to switch to ants, which could be stored in vials. With the encouragement of Marion R. Smith, a myrmecologist from the National Museum of Natural History in Washington, Wilson began a survey of all the ants of Alabama. This study led him to report the first colony of fire ants in the U.S., near the port of Mobile.

Wilson said he went to 15 or 16 schools within 11 years of schooling.

Education
Wilson was concerned that he might not be able to afford to go to a university, and tried to enlist in the United States Army, intending to earn U.S. government financial support for his education. He failed the Army medical examination due to his impaired eyesight, but was able to afford to enroll in the University of Alabama, where he earned his Bachelor of Science in 1949 and Master of Science in biology in 1950. The next year, Wilson transferred to Harvard University. 
 
Appointed to the Harvard Society of Fellows, he could travel on overseas expeditions, collecting ant species of Cuba and Mexico and travel the South Pacific, including Australia, New Guinea, Fiji, New Caledonia, and Sri Lanka. In 1955, he received his Ph.D. and married Irene Kelley.

Career

From 1956 until 1996, Wilson was part of the faculty of Harvard. He began as an ant taxonomist and worked on understanding their microevolution, how they developed into new species by escaping environmental disadvantages and moving into new habitats. He developed a theory of the "taxon cycle".

In collaboration with mathematician William H. Bossert, Wilson developed a classification of pheromones based on insect communication patterns. In the 1960s, he collaborated with mathematician and ecologist Robert MacArthur in developing the theory of species equilibrium. In the 1970s he and Daniel S. Simberloff tested this theory on tiny mangrove islets in the Florida Keys. They eradicated all insect species and observed the re-population by new species. Wilson and MacArthur's book The Theory of Island Biogeography became a standard ecology text.

In 1971, he published The Insect Societies, which argues that insect behavior and the behavior of other animals are influenced by similar evolutionary pressures. In 1973, Wilson was appointed the curator of entomology at the Harvard Museum of Comparative Zoology. In 1975, he published the book Sociobiology: The New Synthesis applying his theories of insect behavior to vertebrates, and in the last chapter, humans. He speculated that evolved and inherited tendencies were responsible for hierarchical social organization among humans. In 1978 he published On Human Nature, which dealt with the role of biology in the evolution of human culture and won a Pulitzer Prize for General Nonfiction.

Wilson was named the Frank B. Baird, Jr., Professor of Science in 1976 and, after his retirement from Harvard in 1996, became the Pellegrino University Professor Emeritus.

In 1981 after collaborating with Charles Lumsden, he published Genes, Mind and Culture, a theory of gene-culture coevolution. In 1990 he published The Ants, co-written with Bert Hölldobler, his second Pulitzer Prize for General Nonfiction.

In the 1990s, he published The Diversity of Life (1992), an autobiography: Naturalist (1994), and Consilience: The Unity of Knowledge (1998) about the unity of the natural and social sciences. Wilson was praised for his environmental advocacy, and his secular-humanist and deist ideas pertaining to religious and ethical matters.

Wilson was dubbed multiple monikers throughout his career, these included descriptions as the "father of biodiversity," "ant man," and "Darwin's heir." In a PBS interview, David Attenborough described Wilson as "a magic name to many of us working in the natural world, for two reasons. First, he is a towering example of a specialist, a world authority. Nobody in the world has ever known as much as Ed Wilson about ants. But, in addition to that intense knowledge and understanding, he has the widest of pictures. He sees the planet and the natural world that it contains in amazing detail but extraordinary coherence".

 Support of J. Philippe Rushton 
Prior to Wilson's death, his personal correspondences were donated to the Library of Congress at the Library's request. Following his death, several articles were published discussing the discrepancy between Wilson's legacy as a champion of biogeography and conservation biology, and his support of scientific racism and pseudoscientists. Specifically, the Library of Congress archive included letters defending the work of J. Philippe Rushton over several years. Rushton was a controversial psychologist at the University of Western Ontario, who later headed the Pioneer Fund.

From the late 1980s to the early 1990s, Wilson wrote several emails to Rushton's colleagues defending Rushton's work in the face of widespread criticism of "scholarly misconduct", "misrepresenting data", and confirmation bias, all of which were tactics that were allegedly wielded by Rushton to support his personal ideas on race. Wilson also sponsored an article written by Rushton in PNAS, and during the review process, Wilson intentionally sought out reviewers for the article who he believed would likely already agree with its premise. Wilson kept his support of Rushton's racist ideologies behind-the-scenes so as to not draw too much attention to himself or tarnish his own reputation. Wilson responded to another request from Rushton to sponsor a second PNAS article with the following: "You have my support in many ways, but for me to sponsor an article on racial differences in the PNAS would be counterproductive for both of us." Wilson also remarked that the reason Rushton's ideologies were not more widely supported is because of the "... fear of being called racist, which is virtually a death sentence in American academia if taken seriously. I admit that I myself have tended to avoid the subject of Rushton's work, out of fear."

In 2022, the E.O. Wilson Biodiversity Foundation issued a statement rejecting Wilson's support of Rushton and racism, on behalf of the board of directors and staff.

Work

Sociobiology: The New Synthesis, 1975

Wilson used sociobiology and evolutionary principles to explain the behavior of social insects and then to understand the social behavior of other animals, including humans, thus establishing sociobiology as a new scientific field. He argued that all animal behavior, including that of humans, is the product of heredity, environmental stimuli, and past experiences, and that free will is an illusion. He referred to the biological basis of behavior as the "genetic leash". The sociobiological view is that all animal social behavior is governed by epigenetic rules worked out by the laws of evolution. This theory and research proved to be seminal, controversial, and influential.

Wilson argued that the unit of selection is a gene, the basic element of heredity. The target of selection is normally the individual who carries an ensemble of genes of certain kinds. With regard to the use of kin selection in explaining the behavior of eusocial insects, the "new view that I'm proposing is that it was group selection all along, an idea first roughly formulated by Darwin."

Sociobiological research was at the time particularly controversial with regard to its application to humans. The theory established a scientific argument for rejecting the common doctrine of tabula rasa, which holds that human beings are born without any innate mental content and that culture functions to increase human knowledge and aid in survival and success.

ReceptionSociobiology: The New Synthesis initially met with substantial criticism. Following its publication, Wilson was accused of racism, misogyny, and sympathy to eugenics. Several of Wilson's colleagues at Harvard, such as Richard Lewontin and Stephen Jay Gould, were strongly opposed. Gould, Lewontin, and others from the Sociobiology Study Group from the Boston area, associated with the organization Science for the People, wrote "Against 'Sociobiology'" in an open letter criticizing Wilson's "deterministic view of human society and human action". Other public lectures, reading groups, and press releases were organized criticizing Wilson's work. In response, Wilson produced a discussion article entitled "Academic Vigilantism and the Political Significance of Sociobiology" in BioScience.

In February 1978, while participating in a discussion on sociobiology at the annual meeting of the American Association for the Advancement of Science, Wilson was surrounded, chanted at and doused with water by members of the International Committee Against Racism, who accused Wilson of advocating racism and genetic determinism. Steven Jay Gould, who was present at the event, and Science for the People, which had previously protested Wilson, condemned the attack.

Philosopher Mary Midgley encountered Sociobiology in the process of writing Beast and Man (1979) and significantly rewrote the book to offer a critique of Wilson's views. Midgley praised the book for the study of animal behavior, clarity, scholarship, and encyclopedic scope, but extensively critiqued Wilson for conceptual confusion, scientism, and anthropomorphism of genetics.

On Human Nature, 1978
Wilson wrote in his 1978 book On Human Nature, "The evolutionary epic is probably the best myth we will ever have." Wilson's fame prompted use of the morphed phrase epic of evolution. The book won the Pulitzer Prize in 1979.

The Ants, 1990
Wilson, along with Bert Hölldobler, carried out a systematic study of ants and ant behavior, culminating in the 1990 encyclopedic work The Ants. Because much self-sacrificing behavior on the part of individual ants can be explained on the basis of their genetic interests in the survival of the sisters, with whom they share 75% of their genes (though the actual case is some species' queens mate with multiple males and therefore some workers in a colony would only be 25% related), Wilson argued for a sociobiological explanation for all social behavior on the model of the behavior of the social insects.

Wilson said in reference to ants that "Karl Marx was right, socialism works, it is just that he had the wrong species". He asserted that individual ants and other eusocial species were able to reach higher Darwinian fitness putting the needs of the colony above their own needs as individuals because they lack reproductive independence: individual ants cannot reproduce without a queen, so they can only increase their fitness by working to enhance the fitness of the colony as a whole. Humans, however, do possess reproductive independence, and so individual humans enjoy their maximum level of Darwinian fitness by looking after their own survival and having their own offspring.

Consilience, 1998
In his 1998 book Consilience: The Unity of Knowledge, Wilson discussed methods that have been used to unite the sciences, and might be able to unite the sciences with the humanities. He argued that knowledge is a single, unified thing, not divided between science and humanistic inquiry. Wilson used the term "consilience" to describe the synthesis of knowledge from different specialized fields of human endeavor. He defined human nature as a collection of epigenetic rules, the genetic patterns of mental development. He argued that culture and rituals are products, not parts, of human nature. He said art is not part of human nature, but our appreciation of art is. He suggested that concepts such as art appreciation, fear of snakes, or the incest taboo (Westermarck effect) could be studied by scientific methods of the natural sciences and be part of interdisciplinary research.

Spiritual and political beliefs

Scientific humanism
Wilson coined the phrase scientific humanism as "the only worldview compatible with science's growing knowledge of the real world and the laws of nature". Wilson argued that it is best suited to improve the human condition. In 2003, he was one of the signers of the Humanist Manifesto.

God and religion
On the question of God, Wilson described his position as "provisional deism" and explicitly denied the label of "atheist", preferring "agnostic". He explained his faith as a trajectory away from traditional beliefs: "I drifted away from the church, not definitively agnostic or atheistic, just Baptist & Christian no more." Wilson argued that belief in God and the rituals of religion are products of evolution. He argued that they should not be rejected or dismissed, but further investigated by science to better understand their significance to human nature. In his book The Creation, Wilson wrote that scientists ought to "offer the hand of friendship" to religious leaders and build an alliance with them, stating that "Science and religion are two of the most potent forces on Earth and they should come together to save the creation."

Wilson made an appeal to the religious community on the lecture circuit at Midland College, Texas, for example, and that "the appeal received a 'massive reply'", that a covenant had been written and that a "partnership will work to a substantial degree as time goes on".

In a New Scientist interview published on January 21, 2015, however, Wilson said that "Religion 'is dragging us down' and must be eliminated 'for the sake of human progress, and "So I would say that for the sake of human progress, the best thing we could possibly do would be to diminish, to the point of eliminating, religious faiths."

Ecology
Wilson said that, if he could start his life over he would work in microbial ecology, when discussing the reinvigoration of his original fields of study since the 1960s. He studied the mass extinctions of the 20th century and their relationship to modern society, and identifying mass extinction as the greatest threat to Earth's future. In 1998 argued for an ecological approach at the Capitol:

From the late 1970s Wilson was actively involved in the global conservation of biodiversity, contributing and promoting research. In 1984 he published Biophilia, a work that explored the evolutionary and psychological basis of humanity's attraction to the natural environment. This work introduced the word biophilia which influenced the shaping of modern conservation ethics. In 1988 Wilson edited the BioDiversity volume, based on the proceedings of the first US national conference on the subject, which also introduced the term biodiversity into the language. This work was very influential in creating the modern field of biodiversity studies. In 2011, Wilson led scientific expeditions to the Gorongosa National Park in Mozambique and the archipelagos of Vanuatu and New Caledonia in the southwest Pacific. Wilson was part of the international conservation movement, as a consultant to Columbia University's Earth Institute, as a director of the American Museum of Natural History, Conservation International, The Nature Conservancy and the World Wildlife Fund.

Understanding the scale of the extinction crisis led him to advocate for forest protection, including the "Act to Save America's Forests", first introduced in 1998, until 2008, but never passed. The Forests Now Declaration calls for new markets-based mechanisms to protect tropical forests. Wilson once said destroying a rainforest for economic gain was like burning a Renaissance painting to cook a meal. In 2014, Wilson called for setting aside 50% of Earth's surface for other species to thrive in as the only possible strategy to solve the extinction crisis. The idea became the basis for his book Half-Earth (2016) and for the Half-Earth Project of the E.O. Wilson Biodiversity Foundation. Wilson's influence regarding ecology through popular science was covered by Alan G. Gross in The Scientific Sublime (2018).

Wilson was instrumental in launching the Encyclopedia of Life (EOL) initiative with the goal of creating a global database to include information on the 1.9 million species recognized by science. Currently, it includes information on practically all known species. This open and searchable digital repository for organism traits, measurements, interactions and other data has more than 300 international partners and countless scientists to provide global user access to knowledge of life on Earth. For his part, Wilson discovered and described more than 400 species of ants.

Retirement and death
In 1996, Wilson officially retired from Harvard University, where he continued to hold the positions of Professor Emeritus and Honorary Curator in Entomology. 
He fully retired from Harvard in 2002 at age 73. After stepping down, he published more than a dozen books, including a digital biology textbook for the iPad.

He founded the E.O. Wilson Biodiversity Foundation, which finances the PEN/E. O. Wilson Literary Science Writing Award and is an "independent foundation" at the Nicholas School of the Environment, Duke University. Wilson became a special lecturer at Duke University as part of the agreement.

Wilson and his wife, Irene, resided in Lexington, Massachusetts. He had a daughter, Catherine. He was preceded in death by his wife (on August 7, 2021) and died in nearby Burlington on December 26, 2021, at the age of 92.

Awards and honors

Wilson's scientific and conservation honors include:

 Member of the American Academy of Arts and Sciences, elected 1959
 Member of the National Academy of Sciences, elected 1969
 Member of the American Philosophical Society, elected 1976.
 U.S. National Medal of Science, 1977
 Leidy Award, 1979, from the Academy of Natural Sciences of Philadelphia
 Pulitzer Prize for On Human Nature, 1979
 Tyler Prize for Environmental Achievement, 1984
 ECI Prize, International Ecology Institute, terrestrial ecology, 1987
 Honorary doctorate from the Faculty of Mathematics and Science at Uppsala University, Sweden, 1987
  Academy of Achievement Golden Plate Award, 1988
 His books The Insect Societies and Sociobiology: The New Synthesis were honored with the Science Citation Classic award by the Institute for Scientific Information.
 Crafoord Prize, 1990, a prize awarded by the Royal Swedish Academy of Sciences 
 Pulitzer Prize for The Ants (with Bert Hölldobler), 1991
 International Prize for Biology, 1993
 Carl Sagan Award for Public Understanding of Science, 1994
 The National Audubon Society's Audubon Medal, 1995
 Time magazine's 25 Most Influential People in America, 1995
 Certificate of Distinction, International Congresses of Entomology, Florence, Italy 1996
 Benjamin Franklin Medal for Distinguished Achievement in the Sciences of the American Philosophical Society, 1998.
 American Humanist Association's 1999 Humanist of the Year
 Lewis Thomas Prize for Writing about Science, 2000
 Nierenberg Prize, 2001
 Distinguished Eagle Scout Award 2004 
 Dauphin Island Sea Lab christened one of its research vessel the R/V E.O. Wilson.
 Linnean Tercentenary Silver Medal, 2006
 Addison Emery Verrill Medal from the Peabody Museum of Natural History, 2007
 TED Prize 2007 given yearly to "honor a maximum of three individuals who have shown that they can, in some way, positively impact life on this planet."
 XIX Premi Internacional Catalunya 2007
 Member of the World Knowledge Dialogue Honorary Board, and Scientist in Residence for the 2008 symposium organized in Crans-Montana (Switzerland).
 E.O. Wilson Biophilia Center on Nokuse Plantation in Walton County, Florida 2009 video
 The Explorers Club Medal, 2009
 2010 BBVA Frontiers of Knowledge Award in the Ecology and Conservation Biology Category
 Thomas Jefferson Medal in Architecture, 2010
 2010 Heartland Prize for fiction for his first novel Anthill: A Novel EarthSky Science Communicator of the Year, 2010
 International Cosmos Prize, 2012
 Kew International Medal (2014)
 Doctor of Science, honoris causa, from the American Museum of Natural History (2014)
 2016 Harper Lee Award
 Commemoration in the species' epithet of Myrmoderus eowilsoni (2018)
 Commemoration in the species' epithet of Miniopterus wilsoni (2020)

Main works

 , coauthored with William Brown Jr.; paper honored in 1986 as a Science Citation Classic, i.e., as one of the most frequently cited scientific papers of all time.
 The Theory of Island Biogeography, 1967, Princeton University Press (2001 reprint), with Robert H. MacArthur
 The Insect Societies, 1971, Harvard University Press, 
 Sociobiology: The New Synthesis 1975, Harvard University Press, (Twenty-fifth Anniversary Edition, 2000 )
 On Human Nature, 1979, Harvard University Press, winner of the 1979 Pulitzer Prize for General Nonfiction.
 Genes, Mind and Culture: The Coevolutionary Process, 1981, Harvard University Press, 
 Promethean Fire: Reflections on the Origin of Mind, 1983, Harvard University Press, 
 Biophilia, 1984, Harvard University Press, 
 Success and Dominance in Ecosystems: The Case of the Social Insects, 1990, Inter-Research, 
 The Ants, 1990, Harvard University Press, Winner of the 1991 Pulitzer Prize, with Bert Hölldobler
 The Diversity of Life, 1992, Harvard University Press, The Diversity of Life: Special Edition, 
 The Biophilia Hypothesis, 1993, Shearwater Books, with Stephen R. Kellert
 Journey to the Ants: A Story of Scientific Exploration, 1994, Harvard University Press, with Bert Hölldobler
 Naturalist, 1994, Shearwater Books, 
 In Search of Nature, 1996, Shearwater Books, with Laura Simonds Southworth
 Consilience: The Unity of Knowledge, 1998, Knopf, 
 The Future of Life, 2002, Knopf, 
 Pheidole in the New World: A Dominant, Hyperdiverse Ant Genus, 2003, Harvard University Press, 
 The Creation: An Appeal to Save Life on Earth, September 2006, W. W. Norton & Company, Inc. 
 Nature Revealed: Selected Writings 1949–2006, 
 Anthill: A Novel, April 2010, W. W. Norton & Company, Inc. 
 Kingdom of Ants: Jose Celestino Mutis and the Dawn of Natural History in the New World, 2010, Johns Hopkins University Press, Baltimore, with José María Gómez Durán 
 The Social Conquest of Earth, 2012, Liveright Publishing Corporation, New York, 
 Letters to a Young Scientist, 2014, Liveright, 
 A Window on Eternity: A Biologist's Walk Through Gorongosa National Park, 2014, Simon & Schuster, 
 The Meaning of Human Existence, 2014, Liveright, 
 Half-Earth, 2016, Liveright, 
 The Origins of Creativity, 2017, Liveright, 
 Genesis: The Deep Origin of Societies, 2019, Liveright; 
 Tales from the Ant World, 2020, Liveright,  
 Naturalist: A Graphic Adaptation November 10, 2020, Island Press;  

Edited works
 From So Simple a Beginning: Darwin's Four Great Books, edited with introductions by Edward O. Wilson (2005, W. W. Norton) 

References
 

 Sources 

 Books 

 
 

 Journals 
 
 

 Newspapers 

 

External links

 Curriculum vitae
 E.O. Wilson Foundation
  Review of The Social Conquest of Earth''
 
 
 E.O. Wilson Biophilia Center
 
 

1929 births
2021 deaths
20th-century American male writers
20th-century American non-fiction writers
20th-century American novelists
20th-century American zoologists
21st-century American male writers
21st-century American non-fiction writers
21st-century American novelists
21st-century American zoologists
American autobiographers
American conservationists
American deists
American ecologists
American entomologists
American humanists
American male non-fiction writers
American male novelists
American naturalists
American non-fiction environmental writers
American science writers
American skeptics
Biogeographers
Critics of religions
Entomological writers
Ethologists
Evolutionary biologists
Fellows of the Ecological Society of America
Foreign Members of the Royal Society
Harvard University alumni
Harvard University faculty
Human evolution theorists
Members of the United States National Academy of Sciences
Myrmecologists
National Medal of Science laureates
Neutral theory
Novelists from Alabama
Novelists from Massachusetts
Philosophers of science
Philosophers of social science
Pulitzer Prize for General Non-Fiction winners
Race and intelligence controversy
Secular humanists
Sociobiologists
Sustainability advocates
University of Alabama alumni
Writers about activism and social change
Writers about religion and science
Writers from Birmingham, Alabama
Members of the American Philosophical Society